Mamadou Kassé Hann (born 10 October 1986, Pikine, Senegal) is a Senegalese hurdler. At the 2012 Summer Olympics, he competed in the Men's 400 metres hurdles. He was a finalist at the 2013 World Championships in Athletics, placing seventh. Hanne was a two-time individual medalist at the African Championships in Athletics.

He transferred his eligibility to France on 22 August 2014 and became eligible to represent his adoptive nation internationally from June 2015 onwards.

Competition record

References

1986 births
Living people
French male hurdlers
Senegalese male hurdlers
Olympic athletes of Senegal
Athletes (track and field) at the 2012 Summer Olympics
World Athletics Championships athletes for Senegal
Athletes (track and field) at the 2016 Summer Olympics
Olympic athletes of France
World Athletics Championships athletes for France
Athletes (track and field) at the 2007 All-Africa Games
African Games competitors for Senegal
21st-century French people
21st-century Senegalese people